Mir Kuh-e Vosta (also Romanized as Mīr Kūh-e Vosţá and Mīrkūh-e Vosţá; also known as Mīr Kūh and Mīr Kūh-e ‘Alīmīrzā) is a village in Razliq Rural District, in the Central District of Sarab County, East Azerbaijan Province, Iran. At the 2006 census, its population was 122, in 26 families.

References 

Populated places in Sarab County